Arthrobacter monumenti is a bacterium species from the genus Arthrobacter which has been isolated from biofilms covering a Servilia tomb in Carmona, Spain.

References

Further reading

External links
Type strain of Arthrobacter monumenti at BacDive -  the Bacterial Diversity Metadatabase

Bacteria described in 2005
Micrococcaceae